The spotted-necked otter (Hydrictis maculicollis), or speckle-throated otter, is an otter native to sub-Saharan Africa.

Description

Like many other otters, it is sleek and has webbed paws for swimming. Females have two pairs of teats, and while males have a large scrotum, the penis is hidden beneath the skin, to reduce drag while swimming.

Although considerable variation exists among individuals, their fur is usually chocolate to reddish brown and marked with creamy or white blotches over the chest and throat. The head is broad with a short muzzle, small rounded ears, and a hairless nose pad. The teeth are adapted for consuming fish, with large sharp upper canine teeth, curved lower canines, and sharp carnassial teeth. The jaws are similarly adapted, with the mandibular fossa fitting so snugly into the condyle on the lower jaw that the latter cannot move sideways, making it easier to capture and hold fish.

Although up to five subspecies have previously been identified, these most likely represent a natural variation in appearance between individuals, and no subspecies are currently recognised.

Distribution and habitat
Spotted-necked otters are found in lakes and larger rivers throughout much of Africa south of 10°N. They are common in Lake Victoria and across Zambia, but for some unexplained reason often are absent from what appear to be suitable habitats, such as the lakes and rivers of East Africa and the Zambezi below Victoria Falls. No evidence of spotted-necked otters venturing into salt water has been found.

Behavior and ecology
They are diurnal, and appear to hunt entirely by sight using short dives of less than 20 seconds each in clear water with good visibility. Larger prey items are carried ashore, while smaller items are eaten while treading water. Known predators on the otters include lions, crocodiles and African fish eagles.

The otters are sometimes found in family groups, but appear to be social only under certain conditions. Males and females are separated for at least part of the year. They normally hunt alone, except when mothers are training their young, and are not territorial, sheltering through the night in short burrows, rock crevices, or patches of dense vegetation. As with many other otters, these paths are marked by "sprainting" sites in which they habitually defecate and urinate.

Spotted-necked otters are very vocal, uttering high, thin whistles and rapid, shrill chatters. The female bears a litter of up to three young after a gestation period around two months. The young are born blind and helpless, and the mother cares for them for almost a year.

Conservation
The spotted-necked otter is in decline, mostly due to habitat destruction and pollution of its clear-water habitats. It is hunted as bushmeat.

References

External links
ITIS Standard Report
Otter Specialist Group report

spotted-necked otter
Mammals of Sub-Saharan Africa
spotted-necked otter